Nonhlanhla Nyathi (born 5 December 1987) is a Zimbabwean cricketer. She plays Right Hand Band, her main specialty is as a wicket-keeper, a position she has held since 2008 for the Zimbabwean Women's Team. She has represented Zimbabwe in major games for the ICC Women's Qualifiers and also plays local cricket at Takashinga cricket club. She played for the Zimbabwe women's national cricket team in the 2017 Women's Cricket World Cup Qualifier in February 2017.

References

1987 births
Living people
Zimbabwean women cricketers